Scenes from Hell is the eighth full-length studio album by the Japanese extreme metal band Sigh. It is the band's first full-length recording to feature Dr. Mikannibal. On October 15, 2009 the band posted the album cover and set January 19, 2010 as the official release date.

A music video was released for the song "Prelude to the Oracle".

Track listing

Personnel
Sigh
 Mirai Kawashima – vocals, orchestrations, piano, organ, theremin, whistle, sitar, tabla, tampura
 Dr. Mikannibal – vocals, saxophone
 Satoshi Fujinami – bass
 Shinichi Ishikawa – guitar
 Junichi Harashima – drums

Additional musician
 David Tibet – spoken word ("The Red Funeral")

Technical personnel
 James Murphy – mastering
 Eliran Kantor – artwork

References

2010 albums
Sigh (band) albums
The End Records albums
Albums with cover art by Eliran Kantor